Giovanni Castiglione de Polena (died 1 Sep 1456) was a Roman Catholic prelate who served as Bishop of Orvieto (1454–1456) and Bishop of Penne e Atri (1433–1454).

Biography
On 23 Mar 1433, Giovanni Castiglione was appointed by Pope Eugene IV as Bishop of Penne e Atri.

While bishop, he was the principal co-consecrator of Canute Mikkelsen, Bishop of Viborg (1452).

On 21 Oct 1454, he was appointed Bishop of Orvieto by  Pope Nicholas V. He served as Bishop of Orvieto until his death on 1 Sep 1456.

References

External links and additional sources
 (Chronology of Bishops) 
 (Chronology of Bishops) 

15th-century Italian Roman Catholic bishops
Bishops appointed by Pope Eugene IV
Bishops appointed by Pope Nicholas V
1456 deaths